The discography of English singer-songwriter Lucy Spraggan consists of 6 studio albums, 1 EP, 18 singles and 14 music videos. Her debut studio album, Top Room at the Zoo, was released in October 2011. The album peaked at number twenty-two on the UK Albums Chart. Her second studio album, Join the Club, was released in October 2013. The album peaked at number seven on the UK Albums Chart. The album includes the singles "Tea and Toast", "Lighthouse" and "Last Night (Beer Fear)". Her third studio album, We Are, was released in May 2015. The album peaked at number seventeen on the UK Albums Chart. The album includes the single "Unsinkable". Her fourth studio album, I Hope You Don't Mind Me Writing, was released in January 2017. The album peaked at number twelve on the UK Albums Chart. The album includes the singles "Dear You" and "Modern Day Frankenstein". Her fifth studio album, Today Was a Good Day, was released in May 2019. The album peaked at number twelve on the UK Albums Chart. The album includes the singles "Stick the Kettle On" and "Lucky Stars". Her sixth studio album, Choices, was released in February 2021. The album was preceded by singles "Flowers", "Sober" and "Roots". In December 2022, Spraggan released the single "Balance", taken from her forthcoming seventh studio album of the same name, due for release April 2023.

Albums

Extended plays

Singles

As lead artist

As featured artist

Promotional singles

Other charted songs

Music videos

Notes

References

Discographies of British artists